The 1904 Wyoming gubernatorial election was held on November 8, 1904. Shortly after he began his second term in 1903, Governor DeForest Richards died in office, elevating Secretary of State Fenimore Chatterton to the Governorship and triggering a special election in 1904 to fill the balance of Richards's term. Chatterton ran for re-election, but was defeated for renomination at the Republican convention by Bryant B. Brooks. Former Congressman John E. Osborne, the former Territorial Governor, was nominated by the Democratic Party. Aided by President Theodore Roosevelt's landslide victory over Democrat Alton B. Parker in the presidential election, Brooks overwhelmingly defeated Osborne.

Party conventions
As the Republican convention began on May 18, 1904, former State Representative Bryant B. Brooks was seen as having a slight edge over acting Governor Fenimore Chatterton, with the leading rumor that the Laramie County delegation held the balance of power and favored Brooks over Chatterton. Ultimately, the contest between Brooks and Chatterton was not close, with Brooks defeating the incumbent Governor on the first ballot with 83 votes to Chatterton's 41.

Meanwhile, as the Democratic convention began on September 7, 1904, several candidates were seen as likely nominees: former Congressman and Territorial Governor John E. Osborne; former State Senator William H. Holliday, the 1894 Democratic nominee for Governor; Robert H. Homer, a former territorial legislator; and W. Dean Hays, with Osborne seen as the frontrunner. After several days of indecision, Osborne—who had been reluctant to run—allowed himself to be nominated and he was approved by acclamation.

General election

Results

Results by county

References

1904 Wyoming elections
1904
Wyoming
Wyoming 1904